Brandon Bell may refer to:
 Brandon Bell (American football) (born 1995), American football linebacker
 Brandon Bell (record producer), American producer and songwriter
 Brandon Bell (recording engineer), American recording engineer
 Brandon Bell (Virginia politician) (born 1958), American state senator
 Brandon P. Bell (born 1985), American actor

See also
 Brandon Belt (born 1988), American baseball player